The Blakes Slept Here is a 1953 film directed by Jacques Brunius. Brunius also wrote the screenplay along with Roy Plomley. The 36-minute film chronicles the life of a middle-class British family from roughly 1850 to the end of World War II.

Cast and characters

External links

1953 films
1953 short films
British short films
1950s English-language films